The eleventh series of Dancing on Ice began airing on 6 January 2019 on ITV. Filming took place in the purpose-built studio at Bovingdon Airfield, which was set up for series ten when the show was revived in 2018. An announcement was made on 11 March 2018, during the series ten finale, that the show had been recommissioned for another series.

Phillip Schofield and Holly Willoughby once again hosted the show; Christopher Dean, Jayne Torvill, Ashley Banjo and Jason Gardiner all returned as judges; and former judge Karen Barber returned as head coach, a role that she last held in 2012 for series seven. Professional skater Daniel Whiston, who has partnered with a celebrity skater in every series since 2006, did not take part in the competition in 2019 but instead took on the role of Associate Creative Director. Jordan Banjo, who was a host in the backstage rink in 2018, was not able to return to the show due to scheduling conflicts; series ten contestant Kem Cetinay joined the show in the role of digital host, as Banjo's replacement. Sam Matterface returned as a commentator for series eleven.

The competition was won by James Jordan and his professional partner Alexandra Schauman, making it a first win for Schauman who has appeared in the show since 2010 (with the exception of 2013 and 2018). This was also Jason Gardiner’s last series on The Ice Panel with John Barrowman later announced as his replacement.

Couples
On 1 October 2018, Gemma Collins and Richard Blackwood were announced as the first two celebrities for series eleven. More celebrities were revealed in the following days, and the line-up was concluded on 5 October.

On 29 October, it was revealed that eight of the professional skaters from series ten would return: Matt Evers, Sylvain Longchambon, Brianne Delcourt, Mark Hanretty, reigning champion Vanessa Bauer, Alex Murphy, Brandee Malto and Hamish Gaman. Two of the professional skaters who last took part in series nine in 2014, Alexandra Schauman and Łukasz Różycki, were to rejoin the show alongside new professionals Carlotta Edwards and Alexander Demetriou, who would be making their Dancing on Ice debuts. The professionals not returning from last series were Ale Izquierdo, Melody Le Moal and Matej Silecky, while longstanding professional Daniel Whiston would be returning as the show's Creative Director.

Scoring chart

 indicates the couple eliminated that week
 indicates the couple were in the skate-off but not eliminated
 indicates the winning couple
 indicates the runner-up couple
 indicates the third-place couple
 indicate the highest score for that week
 indicate the lowest score for that week
"—" indicates the couple(s) that did not skate that week

Average chart
This table only counts for dances scored on a traditional 40-point scale. The extra points from the Skate Battle are not included.

Live show details

Results summary
Colour key

 Dean did not need to vote as there was already a majority.
 Torvill did not need to vote as there was already a majority.

Week 1 (6 January)
 Group performance: "Come Alive"—from The Greatest Showman (all)
"Proud Mary"—Tina Turner (Brian & Alex, Melody & Alexander, Richard & Carlotta, Ryan & Brandee, Saira & Mark and Wes & Vanessa)

The couple with the lowest votes from Week 1 will go up against the couple with the lowest votes from Week 2 in the Skate-off.

Week 2 (13 January)
 Head judge: Dean
 Group performance: "Electricity"—Silk City & Dua Lipa (performed by professional skaters)
 "Runaway Baby"—Bruno Mars (Didi & Łukasz, Gemma & Matt, James & Alexandra, Jane & Sylvain, Mark & Brianne, Saara & Hamish)

The couple with the lowest votes from this week will go up against Mark & Brianne, the couple with the lowest votes from Week 1, in the Skate-off.

Save Me skates
 Mark & Brianne: "Don't Leave Me This Way"—Harold Melvin & the Blue Notes
 Ryan & Brandee: "Shake It Off"—Taylor Swift
Judges' votes to save
Gardiner: Ryan & Brandee
Banjo: Ryan & Brandee
Torvill: Ryan & Brandee
Dean: Did not need to vote but would have saved Ryan & Brandee

Week 3 (20 January)
 Theme: Musicals
 Head judge: Torvill
 Group performance: "There's No Business Like Show Business"—from Annie Get Your Gun (all)

Save Me skates
 Richard & Carlotta: "The Tracks of My Tears"—The Miracles
 Saira & Mark: "Roar"—Katy Perry
Judges' votes to save
Gardiner: Richard & Carlotta
Banjo: Richard & Carlotta
Dean: Saira & Mark
Torvill: Saira & Mark
Despite having two votes each, Richard & Carlotta were eliminated due to head judge Torvill having the overriding vote.

Week 4 (27 January)
 Head judge: Dean
 Torvill & Dean performance: "You've Got a Friend in Me"—Michael Bublé

Due to an injury, Ryan & Brandee did not compete in the live show.

Save Me skates
 Saara & Hamish: "Fight Song"—Rachel Platten
 Didi & Łukasz: "My Girl"—The Temptations
Judges' votes to save
Gardiner: Saara & Hamish 
Banjo: Saara & Hamish
Torvill: Saara & Hamish
Dean: Did not need to vote but would have saved Saara & Hamish

Week 5 (3 February)
Theme: Fairy Tale
Head judge: Torvill
Guest performance: Disney on Ice

Save Me skates
 Saira & Mark: "Express Yourself"—Madonna
 Ryan & Brandee: "Shake It Off"—Taylor Swift
Judges' votes to save
Gardiner: Ryan & Brandee
Banjo: Ryan & Brandee
Dean: Ryan & Brandee
Torvill: Did not need to vote but would have saved Ryan & Brandee

Week 6 (10 February)
Head judge: Dean
Group performance: "Holding Out for a Hero"—Bonnie Tyler (performed by professional skaters)
Guest performance: "Heart Upon My Sleeve"—Avicii (Nick Buckland and Penny Coomes)

Save Me skates
 Gemma & Matt: "Queen of the Night"—Whitney Houston 
 Ryan & Brandee: "High Hopes"—Kodaline
Judges' votes to save
Gardiner: Ryan & Brandee
Banjo: Ryan & Brandee
Torvill: Ryan & Brandee
Dean: Did not need to vote but would have saved Ryan & Brandee

Week 7 (17 February)
Head judge: Torvill
Guest performance: "Rule the World"—Take That (Marigold IceUnity)

Save Me skates
 Ryan & Brandee: "Baggy Trousers"—Madness
 Melody & Alexander: "Fighter"—Christina Aguilera
 Jane & Sylvain: "Hold On"—Wilson Phillips
Judges' votes to save
Gardiner: Melody & Alexander
Banjo: Melody & Alexander
Dean: Melody & Alexander
Torvill: Did not need to vote but would have saved Melody & Alexander

Week 8 (24 February)
Theme: Time Tunnel
Head judge: Dean
Group performance: "Bad Romance"—Lady Gaga (performed by professional skaters)
"Pompeii"—Bastille (Skate Battle)
"#thatPOWER"—will.i.am feat. Justin Bieber (performed by professional skaters)

Save Me skates
 Melody & Alexander: "Rise Up"—Andra Day
 Saara & Hamish: "Who You Are"—Jessie J
Judges' votes to save
Gardiner: Saara & Hamish
Banjo: Saara & Hamish
Torvill: Saara & Hamish
Dean: Did not need to vote but would have saved Saara & Hamish

Week 9: Semi-final (3 March)
Head judge: Torvill
Special musical guest: Olly Murs—"Excuses"

Save Me skates
 Saara & Hamish: "Who You Are"—Jessie J
 Brian & Alex: "Don't Let the Sun Go Down on Me"—Elton John

 Judges' votes to save
 Gardiner: Saara & Hamish
 Banjo: Saara & Hamish
 Dean: Saara & Hamish
 Torvill: Did not need to vote but would have saved Saara & Hamish

Week 10: Final (10 March)
 Themes: Showcase, Favourite skate; Boléro
 Torvill & Dean performance: "Bridge over Troubled Water"—Josh Groban

Ratings
Official ratings are taken from BARB. Viewing figures are from 7 day data.

References

External links
Official website

Series 11
2019 British television seasons